The 2017–18 UNLV Lady Rebels basketball team will represent the University of Nevada, Las Vegas during the 2017–18 NCAA Division I women's basketball season. The Lady Rebels, led by tenth year head coach Kathy Olivier. They play their home games at the Cox Pavilion, attached to the Thomas & Mack Center on UNLV's main campus in Paradise, Nevada. They were a member of the Mountain West Conference. They finished the season 19–12, 14–4 in Mountain West play to win the Mountain West regular season title with Boise State. They lost in the quarterfinals Mountain West women's tournament to Nevada. They earn an automatic bid to the WNIT where they lost in the first round to Utah.

Roster

Schedule

|-
!colspan=9 style="background:#; color:white;"| Non-conference regular season

|-
!colspan=9 style="background:#; color:white;"| Mountain West regular season

|-
!colspan=9 style="background:#; color:#C10202;"| Mountain West Women's Tournament

|-
!colspan=9 style="background:#; color:#C10202;"| WNIT

See also
2017–18 UNLV Runnin' Rebels basketball team

References 

UNLV
UNLV Lady Rebels basketball seasons
UNLV
Rebels
Rebels